Olaf Nygaard (5 September 1894 – 1 April 1978) was a Norwegian cyclist. He competed in two events at the 1920 Summer Olympics.

References

External links
 

1894 births
1978 deaths
Norwegian male cyclists
Olympic cyclists of Norway
Cyclists at the 1920 Summer Olympics
Cyclists from Oslo